Ardhangini( the better half) was  a most successful Assamese-language  drama series that produced by Hamid Ullal under K.B production . It was  premiered on 17 July 2017 on Rang TV . Starred  Preety Kongana and amrit kumar borah .

Plot
Ardhangini is a story of two identical twin sisters who belong to a conservative family. Their father being the head master of a school and mother a perfect home maker holds a very good impression in the society. Like any household, the father highly holds the prestige and pride of his family However, not everyone of the family holds the same regard like the father. The two sisters having immense love and care for each other grew old to have some different characteristics. The elder one is a responsible and family oriented girl. the younger one is totally opposite she becomes more selfish and introvert. The story takes a twist when the younger sister runs away with the fiancé  of her elder sister on her wedding day leaving a note for the family. Reading the note the elder sister decides to sacrifice every thing in order to protect the pride of the family and marries the groom of her younger sister. No one could know the truth since the sisters were identical. Now the story further illustrates the comparative life struggle between the two sisters on how the elder sister tries to become someone else sacrificing her own identity and her own wishes.

Cast 
 Preety Kongana as Gungun (younger sister) and Runjun (elder sister) 
 Amit Kumar Borah as Mrittick choudhary
Guna Borah as Emon
 Sharanga bordoloi as Palash and  Pallab
 Zule Ekka as kaveri
 Paban is Kaveri's husband
 Shilpi is Kaveri and Paban's daughter
 Upamanyu is Mrittick's cousin
 Debojit Mazumdar as Prabhat Bora 
 Parijat, Palash's younger sister
 Nila Saikia as Malaya choudhary
 Kajol Sharma as Sharmila
 Nilakshi Saikia as Nilakshi devi

Location 
Ardhangini was mainly shot in Guwahati. Locations like Guwahati and Nagaon are referred in the serial.

See also 
 Bharaghar

References 

2017 Indian television series debuts
2018 Indian television series endings
Television shows set in Assam
Indian drama television series